St. Colman's Roman Catholic Church and Cemetery (also known as The Little Catholic Church on Irish Mountain) is a historic church located in Dillon, West Virginia which is also called Irish Mountain.

It was built in 1877 and added to the National Register of Historic Places in 1984.

On June 26, 2022, the church burned to the ground in what is believed to be arson.

References

External links
 
 

Irish-American culture in West Virginia
Churches on the National Register of Historic Places in West Virginia
Former Roman Catholic church buildings in West Virginia
Roman Catholic cemeteries in the United States
Buildings and structures in Raleigh County, West Virginia
Roman Catholic churches completed in 1877
National Register of Historic Places in Raleigh County, West Virginia
Cemeteries on the National Register of Historic Places in West Virginia
1877 establishments in West Virginia
Wooden churches in West Virginia
National Register of Historic Places in New River Gorge National Park and Preserve
19th-century Roman Catholic church buildings in the United States